Tomosvaryella sylvatica is a species of fly in the family Pipunculidae.

Distribution
North America, Europe.

References

Pipunculidae
Insects described in 1824
Diptera of Europe
Diptera of North America
Taxa named by Johann Wilhelm Meigen